Nina Lisandrello is an American actress, known for her role as Tess Vargas in the television series Beauty & The Beast. She has guest starred in Law & Order, Conviction, Nurse Jackie, and FBI.

Early life
Lisandrello was born in Encino, a district of Los Angeles, California. At the age of 10 years she did a TV commercial for Levi's directed by David Fincher. This commercial is what later helped her to become a SAG Foundation member.

Lisandrello's mother is the singer and songwriter Helena Springs.

Career
She first appeared on TV screens playing Serena Mallory in the short lived TV series Conviction. She went on to guest star in some other TV shows such as Law & Order, Mercy, Nurse Jackie, and a made-for-TV movie called Washingtonienne. Parallel to her work in television she has also been seen in some films: in the indie Pre, in the comedy The Best and the Brightest, and in the horror movie The Bleeding House.

Her big break came when she was cast as Tess Vargas in The CW's remake of Beauty & the Beast. Even though the series has received "generally unfavorable" reviews, Lisandrello is so far the only star in the show to receive positive feedback from a TV critic. Mary McNamara of Los Angeles Times said "the only point of light is provided by Catherine's partner, Tess, who, as played with great common-sense appeal by Nina Lisandrello, clearly deserves to be on a better show." On January 21, 2013 in Brazil, she won Best Supporting Actress in a Best of 2012 Awards promoted by Brazilian cable channel Universal Channel.

Filmography

References

External links

Living people
21st-century American actresses
Actresses from Los Angeles
Actresses from New York City
American film actresses
American television actresses
People from Encino, Los Angeles
1980 births